The second Philippe government (French: gouvernement Édouard Philippe II) was the forty-first government of the French Fifth Republic. It was the second government formed by Édouard Philippe under President Emmanuel Macron, following the 2017 legislative election and the dissolution of the first Philippe government on 19 June 2017.

The second Philippe government was formed following scandal among ministers during the first Philippe government. La République En Marche! (REM) allies Democratic Movement (MoDem) were facing scandal following allegations that the party used EU funds to pay party workers. Armed Forces Minister Sylvie Goulard was the first to step down, resigning on 20 June 2017. The following day, Minister of Justice François Bayrou and European Affairs Minister, Marielle de Sarnez stepped down. Richard Ferrand, Minister of Territorial Cohesion, stepped down on 19 June 2017 following Le Canard Enchaîné publishing allegations of nepotism on 24 May 2017. Macron defended Ferrand despite the allegations and public polling showing that 70% of respondents wanted Ferrand to step down. On 1 July 2017, a regional prosecutor announced that authorities had launched a preliminary investigation into Ferrand. Ferrand responded to the allegations saying everything was "legal, public and transparent". He was one of the founding members of La République En Marche! and is currently serving as President of the National Assembly.

On 31 July 2018, the second Philippe government survived two motions of no confidence following the Benalla affair: the first one (entered by The Republicans group) obtained 103 ayes, while the second (entered by the groups New Left, Democratic Republican Left and La France Insoumise) obtained 63 votes. Both motions did not reach the quorum of 289 votes required in the National Assembly.

Following the yellow vests movement a motion of no confidence was initiated by the Socialist Party, the French Communist Party and La France Insoumise on 13 December 2018 but the government survived the motion easily as there were merely 70 votes in favour, falling short of the required number of 289.

Until the departure of François de Rugy, there was gender parity in the second Philippe government, with 18 women and 18 men, including the Prime Minister. Since de Rugy's replacement with Élisabeth Borne in July 2019, there have been more women (18) than men (17) in the government. They are, however, over-represented among the Secretaries of State (9 women, 6 men), and less present at the head of full-fledged ministries (9 women, 10 men).

Composition

Initial 

Deputy Ministers

Secretaries of State

Current 

Deputy Ministers

Secretaries of State

Changes 
On 24 November 2017, Christophe Castaner was replaced as Government Spokesman by Benjamin Griveaux, who was replaced as Secretary of State to the Minister of the Economy and Finance by Delphine Gény-Stephann, while Socialist Olivier Dussopt was appointed as Secretary of State to the Minister of Public Action and Accounts.
On 28 August 2018, Nicolas Hulot announced his resignation from the government during a live radio interview on France Inter. On 4 September, Laura Flessel announced her resignation from the government, with their respective replacements announced as François de Rugy and Roxana Mărăcineanu.
On 1 October 2018, the Minister of the Interior Gérard Collomb brings his resignation to President Macron who refuses it. He renews his intention a few days later and Emmanuel Macron accepts the resignation. President Macron then asks Prime Minister Édouard Philippe to act as interim.
On 16 October 2018, Christophe Castaner is appointed Minister of the Interior, which puts an end to Édouard Philippe's tenure. Marc Fesneau replaces Christophe Castaner at Relations with Parliament. Franck Riester is appointed Minister of Culture to replace Françoise Nyssen. Didier Guillaume is appointed Minister of Agriculture and Food in replacement of Stéphane Travert. Jacqueline Gourault is appointed Minister of Territorial Cohesion to replace Jacques Mézard and her portfolio is extended to Relations with local authorities. Delphine Gény-Stephann is not renewed. Are also appointed Secretary of State Gabriel Attal to the National Education, Laurent Nuñez in the Interior, Christelle Dubos to Solidarity and Health, Agnès Pannier-Runacher to the Economy and Emmanuelle Wargon to Ecology. In addition, several members of the government have their powers modified (Sébastien Lecornu, Mounir Mahjoubi) or expanded (Jean-Michel Blanquer, Marlene Schiappa, Julien Denormandie).
On 25 January 2019, Adrien Taquet is appointed Secretary of State for Child Protection to the Minister of Solidarity and Health, Agnès Buzyn.
On 27 March 2019, in view of the 2019 European elections and 2020 municipal election in Paris, Nathalie Loiseau, Benjamin Griveaux, as well as Mounir Mahjoubi leave their government responsibilities, with Le Drian temporarily assuming responsibility for Loiseau's ministerial portfolio.
On 31 March 2019, Amélie de Montchalin is appointed Secretary of State for European Affairs, succeeding Nathalie Loiseau. Sibeth Ndiaye is appointed Government Spokeswoman, succeeding Benjamin Griveaux. Cédric O is appointed State Secretary for the Digital Economy, succeeding Mounir Mahjoubi.
On 16 July 2019, after various revelations from Mediapart, François de Rugy, Minister for the Ecological and Inclusive Transition, resigns. He is replaced by Élisabeth Borne, previously Minister for Transport. Unlike her predecessor, she is not appointed Minister of State.
On 3 September 2019, the High Commissioner for retirement reform, Jean-Paul Delevoye enters the government and reports to Agnès Buzyn, Minister of Solidarity and Health. Jean-Baptiste Djebbari is appointed Secretary of State for Transport and reports to Elisabeth Borne, Minister for the Ecological Transition.
On 18 December 2019, implicated in a case of multiple income and conflict of interest, Jean-Paul Delevoye resigned on December 16, 2019.Laurent Pietraszewski, member of the National Assembly, joined the Government two days later, as Secretary of State in charge of pensions.
On 16 February 2020, following the renunciation of Benjamin Griveaux to his candidacy for municipal elections in Paris, the Minister of Solidarity and Health, Agnès Buzyn is appointed to replace him as head of the list. As a result, she resigns from her post as minister. She is replaced by Olivier Véran.

Gallery

Prime Minister

Ministers

Deputy Ministers

Secretaries of State

References

External links 
Official announcement

French governments
Cabinets established in 2017
Emmanuel Macron